James Cook (1728–1779) was a British explorer, navigator, and map maker.

James Cook may also refer to:

Musicians
 Jamie Cook (born 1985), English guitarist and member of indie rock band Arctic Monkeys
 James Cook, a member of the band Delphic

Sportspeople

Association football
 James Cook (footballer, born 1885) (1885–?), Scottish footballer
 Jim Cook (footballer, born 1904) (1904–?), English footballer (Grimsby Town)
 Jim Cook (footballer, born 1948), Scottish footballer (Kilmarnock FC, Dumbarton FC, Falkirk FC)
 Jamie Cook (footballer) (born 1979), English association football player

American football
 James Cook (offensive guard) (1888–1979), American football player; National Football League offensive guard
 James Cook (running back) (born 1999), American football player; National Football League running back

Other sportspeople
 James Cook (Australian footballer) (born 1974), former Australian Football League player
 James Cook (boxer) (born 1959), British boxer and community worker
 Jamie Cook (rower) (born 1992), English rower
 Jamie Cook (rugby league), New Zealand rugby league footballer
 James Cook (sailor) (born 1952), Australian Olympic sailor
 Jim Cook (baseball) (1879–1949), Major League Baseball player for the Chicago Cubs
 Jim Cook (racing driver) (1921–1983), stock car racer in the NASCAR Grand National Series

Other people
 James Cook (American banker), American banker active in Russia
 James Cook (broadcaster), Scottish journalist for the BBC
 James B. Cook (fl. 1851–1899), English-trained architect in Memphis, Tennessee
 James Dunbar Cook (1921–2007), British rear admiral
 James Hume Cook (1866–1942), Australian politician
 James M. Cook (1807–1868), New York State Comptroller, 1854–1855
 James Pringle Cook (born 1947), American painter
 James Wilfred Cook (1900–1975), English chemist, Vice-Chancellor of the University of Exeter (1954–1966)
 James William Cook (1820–1875), Canadian businessman and political figure
 Jim Cook Jr. (born 1987), American writer
 James H. Cook, discoverer of a Miocene bone bed in Sioux County, Nebraska

Other uses
 James Cook (Skins), a character from Skins
 James Cook Boys Technology High School, Kogarah, Australia
 James Cook High School, South Auckland, New Zealand
 James Cook University, Queensland, Australia
 James Cook University Hospital, a teaching hospital in Marton, Middlesbrough, England
 James Cook railway station, a station being built primarily to serve the hospital
 RRS James Cook, a 2005 British research ship
 Captain James Cook (miniseries), a 1989 Australian mini series

See also
 James Cooke (disambiguation)

Cook, James